Springfield Furniture Company, also known as the General Warehouse Corp., is a historic manufacturing complex located at Springfield, Greene County, Missouri. The original sections were built about 1895, and expanded through 1933.  The complex consists of two large brick factory buildings with brick walls, flat roofs, and little architectural detailing.

It was listed on the National Register of Historic Places in 2006.

References

Industrial buildings and structures on the National Register of Historic Places in Missouri
Industrial buildings completed in 1895
Buildings and structures in Springfield, Missouri
National Register of Historic Places in Greene County, Missouri
Furniture companies of the United States